Leydsdorp is a former gold rush town situated in the Limpopo province of South Africa.

It developed from a gold-mining camp and was proclaimed in 1890, but was virtually abandoned when gold was discovered on the Witwatersrand. Named after Willem Johannes Leyds (1859–1940), state secretary of the South African Republic from 1888 to 1897.

See also 
 SanWild Wildlife Sanctuary, a nearby wildlife rehabilitation center and reserve

References 

Populated places in the Ba-Phalaborwa Local Municipality
1890 establishments in the South African Republic